Emera Centre Northside is a community recreation facility, located in North Sydney, Nova Scotia. It hosts the Northside & District Minor Hockey Association and many other hockey teams. The facility includes a NHL-size ice surface arena with seating for 1,000 people, an elevated indoor mondo-flex covered 1/8 mile walking track, and convention and meeting rooms.

History
In February 1999 the Department of Labour temporarily closed the North Sydney Forum. As a result of that one action, a diverse group of Northside area residents and business people came together to build a new arena. The result is the Northside Civic Centre Society and the facility itself, the Emera Centre Northside.

Notable events
In December 2013-January 2014, the Emera Centre Northside was one of the host arenas for 2014 World U-17 Hockey Challenge. Team USA went on to win the tournament 4-0 against team Pacific.

References
 Emera Centre Northside
 Northside & District Minor Hockey

Buildings and structures in the Cape Breton Regional Municipality
Indoor arenas in Nova Scotia
Indoor ice hockey venues in Canada
Sports venues in Nova Scotia
Tourist attractions in Cape Breton County